The National Security Commission on Artificial Intelligence (NSCAI) was an independent commission of the United States of America established in 2018 to make recommendations to the President and Congress to "advance the development of artificial intelligence, machine learning, and associated technologies to comprehensively address the national security and defense needs of the United States".

It issued its final report in March 2021, saying that the US is not sufficiently prepared to defend or compete against China in the AI era.

Members 

The commission was chaired by Dr. Eric Schmidt former CEO and chairman of Google and later Alphabet Inc. and vice-chaired by former Deputy Secretary of Defense and Under Secretary of the Navy Robert O. Work.

The commission was composed of 15 commissioners, including the chairman and Vice Chairman. Of the fifteen Commissioners, twelve were appointed by members of Congress, two were appointed by the Secretary of Defense, and one was appointed by the Secretary of Commerce. The commission disbanded in October 2021, but many of its leading experts have shifted to a private-sector entity, the Special Competitive Studies Project (SCSP).

Recommendations 
The report's recommendations include:

 dramatically increasing non-defense federal spending on AI research and development, doubling every year from $2 billion in 2022, to $32 billion in 2026. That would bring it up to a level similar to spending on biomedical research
 creation of a Digital Corps to bring skilled tech workers into government
 founding of a Digital Service Academy: an accredited university providing subsidized education in exchange for a commitment to work for a time in government
include civil rights and civil liberty reports for new AI systems or major updates to existing systems
 expanding allocations of employment-based green cards, and giving them to every AI PhD graduate from an accredited U.S. university
 reforming the acquisition management system Department of Defense to make it faster and easier to introduce new technologies.

References

External links 

 

United States national commissions